Anania egentalis is a moth in the family Crambidae. It was described by Hugo Theodor Christoph in 1881. It is found in the Russian Far East (Amur) and Japan (Honshu).

References

Moths described in 1881
Pyraustinae
Moths of Asia
Moths of Japan